Kiha, KiHa, or KIHA may refer to:

 Kiha-a-Piilani
 Kihanuilulumoku, an 11th Alii Aimoku of Hawaii ruling from 1435 to 1465
 Ki-ha, a Korean masculine given name (including a list of people with the name)
 Kiha Software, a Paul Allen funded software startup in Seattle
 KiHa, the technical assignment for diesel multiple unit rolling stock by Japan Railways
 Korea Ice Hockey Association (KIHA), a governing body of ice hockey in South Korea